Lee Jeong-sik (born 17 August 1963) is a South Korean gymnast. He competed in eight events at the 1984 Summer Olympics.

References

1963 births
Living people
South Korean male artistic gymnasts
Olympic gymnasts of South Korea
Gymnasts at the 1984 Summer Olympics
Place of birth missing (living people)
Asian Games medalists in gymnastics
Gymnasts at the 1986 Asian Games
Asian Games silver medalists for South Korea
Medalists at the 1986 Asian Games
20th-century South Korean people